Veronicella portoricensis is a species of air-breathing land slug, a terrestrial pulmonate gastropod mollusk in the family Veronicellidae, the leatherleaf slugs.

Distribution
This species occurs in:
 The highland rainforests of Puerto Rico

References

Veronicellidae
Gastropods described in 1885